Pylos-Nestoras is a municipality in the Messenia regional unit, Peloponnese, Greece. The seat of the municipality is the town Pylos. The municipality has an area of 554.265 km2.

Municipality
The municipality Pylos-Nestoras was formed at the 2011 local government reform by the merger of the following 6 former municipalities, that became municipal units:
Chiliochoria
Koroni
Methoni
Nestor
Papaflessas
Pylos

References

Municipalities of Peloponnese (region)
Populated places in Messenia